Faskhvod (also Romanized as Fasakhowd, Fasakhūd, Faskhowd, and Faskhūd; also known as Fassakhod) is a village in Olya Rural District, in the Central District of Ardestan County, Isfahan Province, Iran. At the 2006 census, its population was 89, in 40 families.

References 

Populated places in Ardestan County